Swaziland competed at the 2014 Summer Youth Olympics, in Nanjing, China from 16 August to 28 August 2014.

Golf

Swaziland was given a team of 2 athletes to compete from the Tripartite Commission.

Individual

Swimming

Swaziland qualified one swimmer.

Boys

Taekwondo

Swaziland was given a wild card to compete.

Girls

References

You
Nations at the 2014 Summer Youth Olympics
Eswatini at the Youth Olympics